The Mwela Rock Paintings are a national monument of Zambia, about  east of Kasama.

The rock paintings (about 700 in all) are in caves and overhangs spread over a very wide area of bush, north of the Kasama Isoka road at 10°10' S 31°13' E, where a signpost denotes the ‘Mwela Rocks National Monument’ with an entry kiosk and guides to escort visitors. The site encompasses eastwards rock outcrops of Mwankole, Sumina, Mulundu, Fwambo, Changa Mwibwe and westwards 10 km from the town Lwimbo rock outcrops. The paintings are associated with the Later Stone Age.

Archaeologists rate the Kasama rock art as one of the largest and most significant collections of ancient art in Southern Africa, though their quality is outdone in Zimbabwe and Namibia. The works are attributed to Stone Age hunter-gatherers (sometimes known as Batwa or Twa) and are up to 2000 years old. Many are abstract designs, but some of the finest pictographs show human figures and animals, often capturing a remarkable sense of fluidity and movement, despite being stylised with huge bodies and minute limbs. It is considered the most compact site of rock paintings in Africa.

The site was declared a National Monument in 1964, although it got recognition as early as 1945. As of 2017 it was reported to attract an average of 350 local and international tourists per month.

The topography of the site is generally fairly undulating and deeper soils are more frequent, where as the central part is generally flat. The outcrops form part of the boundary of the extension of the main plateau areas. The site is also incised by abundant streams and extends over 100 Km2. More than 1000 paintings have been recorded in the rock outcrops, making Mwela Rock Paintings National Monument as one of the densest concentrations of rock art sites anywhere in Africa.

The site is protected under the National Heritage Conservation Commission (NHCC) Act, Cap 173 of the laws of Zambia and was declared collectively as a National Monument under Government notice No. 255 of 1964 bearing the name of Mwela. Part of the area is further protected under the Forestry Act as it falls within the Kasama Forestry Reserve area under the traditional leadership of Senior Chief Mwamba of the Bemba people of northern Zambia.

Kasama Town falls within the extensions of the main plateau with elevation ranging from 1320 to 1535 m. It consists of highlands surrounding the Lake basin area, stretching from Kasama through Mbala, Mporokoso and Kawambwa to Mansa. This plateau region forms part of the Continental divide (up warped plateau) and represents the remnants of the once extensive Miocene peneplain surface.

This site was re-added to the UNESCO World Heritage Tentative List on March 10, 2009, in the Mixed category.

Notes

References
Smith, B. (1997). Zambia's Ancient Rock Art: The Paintings of Kasama. National Heritage Conservation Commission. , 9789982340007.

Rock art in Africa
Zambian culture
Archaeological sites in Zambia
Archaeology of Eastern Africa
World Heritage Tentative List